Stauren Peak is a peak on Staurneset Spur, in the Muhlig-Hofmann Mountains of Queen Maud Land. Plotted from surveys and air photos by the Norwegian Antarctic Expedition (1956–60) and named Stauren (the pole).

Mountains of Queen Maud Land
Princess Astrid Coast